Better Halves is a 1916 American film featuring Oliver Hardy.

Cast
 Oliver Hardy as Plump (as Babe Hardy)
 Billy Ruge as Runt
 Florence McLaughlin as Mrs. Plump (as Florence McLoughlin)
 Ray Godfrey as Mrs. Runt

See also
 List of American films of 1916
 Filmography of Oliver Hardy

External links

1916 films
1916 short films
American silent short films
American black-and-white films
1916 comedy films
Silent American comedy films
American comedy short films
1910s American films